The College of Human Environmental Sciences is a school of environmental science, and one of the major academic divisions of the  University of Missouri in Columbia, Missouri. It awards  undergraduate and graduate degrees and is the only human environmental science college in Missouri. In 2018, the Center for Body Image Research and Policy was established as part of the college.

History
After serving as interim dean for two years J. Sanford Rikoon was appointed dean in 2017.

On February 8, 2021, the University of Missouri announced the academic restructuring of the College of Human Environmental Sciences that, effective August 1, 2021, all departments from the college will merge with other schools and colleges across the campus.

References

External links
Official site

University of Missouri
Educational institutions established in 1960
Education in Columbia, Missouri
1960 establishments in Missouri
Environmental studies institutions in the United States
University subdivisions in Missouri